John Dempsey (born 15 March 1946) is a former footballer who played from the 1960s to the 1980s as a defender.

Career
Starting his career with Fulham, making his debut in 1963 and 149 appearances over six years, Dempsey was signed for West London rivals Chelsea by Dave Sexton in January 1969 for £70,000. He made his Chelsea debut against Southampton in February that year and established himself in the side for the remainder of the 1968-69 season.

Dempsey featured in the successful Chelsea side of the early 1970s, winning the FA Cup with the club in 1970, playing in both fiercely contested final matches against Leeds United as his side eventually ran out 2-1 winners. A year later, the Cup Winners' Cup was added with a win against Real Madrid in another replay in Athens, in which Dempsey scored the opening goal with a powerful volley following a corner (one of only five goals he scored for the club) as Chelsea won 2-1. He won a number of international caps for the Republic of Ireland (he qualified to play for Ireland through his parents).

He had no further success with the club, but remained during the turbulent later 1970s, and eventually left in March 1978 with the club by then in Division Two, and moved to the Philadelphia Fury of the NASL, playing alongside fellow ex-Chelsea star Peter Osgood. In 1979, he was voted the NASL's defender of the year, beating out Franz Beckenbauer who finished second. In the summer of 1976 he played in the National Soccer League with the Serbian White Eagles where he served as a player-coach. His stint with the White Eagles was cut short after a dispute in pay and housing accommodations.

He was appointed player-manager of Dundalk in August 1983 making his League of Ireland debut on 9 October at Sligo Rovers but departed by mutual consent in March after a series of confrontations with referees.

He also had spells managing Maidenhead and Egham Town before retiring from the game in 1984.

He is now involved in local charity work and recently attended the tributes to Peter Osgood at Stamford Bridge following the latter's death.

He currently works with adults with autism and learning difficulties in a daycentre in the London Borough of Barnet. John has been a care worker in the area for a number of years.

Trivia
Dempsey was the first Irish international player ever to be sent off in a 1970 FIFA World Cup qualification game, being that against Hungary national football team in the Ferenc Puskás Stadium

Honours
Chelsea
 FA Cup: 1970
 European Cup Winners' Cup: 1971

See also
 List of Republic of Ireland international footballers born outside the Republic of Ireland

References

External links
 
 

1946 births
Living people
Chelsea F.C. players
Fulham F.C. players
North American Soccer League (1968–1984) players
Philadelphia Fury (1978–1980) players
Republic of Ireland association footballers
Republic of Ireland international footballers
Dundalk F.C. managers
Republic of Ireland football managers
League of Ireland managers
Dundalk F.C. players
League of Ireland players
English Football League players
Association football defenders
Maidenhead United F.C. managers
Egham Town F.C. managers
English people of Irish descent
Serbian White Eagles FC players
Canadian National Soccer League players
Serbian White Eagles FC managers
Canadian National Soccer League coaches
FA Cup Final players